Finno-Ugric ( or ; Fenno-Ugric) or Finno-Ugrian (Fenno-Ugrian), is a traditional grouping of all languages in the Uralic language family except the Samoyedic languages. Its formerly commonly accepted status as a subfamily of Uralic is based on criteria formulated in the 19th century and is criticized by some contemporary linguists such as Tapani Salminen and Ante Aikio as inaccurate and misleading. The three most-spoken Uralic languages, Hungarian, Finnish, and Estonian, are all included in Finno-Ugric, although linguistic roots common to both branches of the traditional Finno-Ugric language tree (Finno-Permic and Ugric) are distant.

The term Finno-Ugric, which originally referred to the entire family, is sometimes used as a synonym for the term Uralic, which includes the Samoyedic languages, as commonly happens when a language family is expanded with further discoveries.

Status
The validity of Finno-Ugric as a phylogenic grouping is under challenge, with some linguists maintaining that the Finno-Permic languages are as distinct from the Ugric languages as they are from the Samoyedic languages spoken in Siberia, or even that none of the Finno-Ugric, Finno-Permic, or Ugric branches has been established. Received opinion is that the easternmost (and last-discovered) Samoyed had separated first and the branching into Ugric and Finno-Permic took place later, but this reconstruction does not have strong support in the linguistic data.

Origins

Attempts at reconstructing a Proto-Finno-Ugric proto-language, a common ancestor of all Uralic languages except for the Samoyedic languages, are largely indistinguishable from Proto-Uralic, suggesting that Finno-Ugric might not be a historical grouping but a geographical one, with Samoyedic being distinct by lexical borrowing rather than actually being historically divergent. It has been proposed that the area in which Proto-Finno-Ugric was spoken reached between the Baltic Sea and the Ural Mountains.

Traditionally, the main set of evidence for the genetic proposal of Proto-Finno-Ugric has come from vocabulary. A large amount of vocabulary (e.g. the numerals "one", "three", "four" and "six"; the body-part terms "hand", "head") is only reconstructed up to the Proto-Finno-Ugric level, and only words with a Samoyedic equivalent have been reconstructed for Proto-Uralic. That methodology has been criticised, as no coherent explanation other than inheritance has been presented for the origin of most of the Finno-Ugric vocabulary (though a small number has been explained as old loanwords from Proto-Indo-European or its immediate successors).

The Samoyedic group has undergone a longer period of independent development, and its divergent vocabulary could be caused by mechanisms of replacement such as language contact. (The Finno-Ugric group is usually dated to approximately 4,000 years ago, the Samoyedic a little over 2,000.) Proponents of the traditional binary division note, however, that the invocation of extensive contact influence on vocabulary is at odds with the grammatical conservatism of Samoyedic.

The consonant *š (voiceless postalveolar fricative) has not been conclusively shown to occur in the traditional Proto-Uralic lexicon, but it is attested in some of the Proto-Finno-Ugric material. Another feature attested in the Finno-Ugric vocabulary is that *i now behaves as a neutral vowel with respect to front-back vowel harmony, and thus there are roots such as *niwa- "to remove the hair from hides".

Regular sound changes proposed for this stage are few and remain open to interpretation. Sammallahti (1988) proposes five, following Janhunen's (1981) reconstruction of Proto-Finno-Permic:
 Compensatory lengthening: development of long vowels from the cluster of vowel plus a particular syllable-final element, of unknown quality, symbolized by *x
 Long open *aa and *ää are then raised to mid *oo and *ee respectively.
 E.g. *ńäxli- → *ńääli- → *ńeeli- "to swallow" (→ Finnish niele-, Hungarian nyel etc.)
 Raising of short *o to *u in open syllables before a subsequent *i
 Shortening of long vowels in closed syllables and before a subsequent open vowel *a, *ä, predating the raising of *ää and *ee
 E.g. *ńäxl+mä → *ńäälmä → *ńälmä "tongue" (→ Northern Sami njalbmi, Hungarian nyelv, etc.)
Sammallahti (1988) further reconstructs sound changes *oo, *ee → *a, *ä (merging with original *a, *ä) for the development from Proto-Finno-Ugric to Proto-Ugric. Similar sound laws are required for other languages as well. Thus, the origin and raising of long vowels may actually belong at a later stage, and the development of these words from Proto-Uralic to Proto-Ugric can be summarized as simple loss of *x (if it existed in the first place at all; vowel length only surfaces consistently in the Baltic-Finnic languages.) The proposed raising of *o has been alternatively interpreted instead as a lowering *u → *o in Samoyedic (PU *lumi → *lomə → Proto-Samoyedic *jom).

Janhunen (2007, 2009) notes a number of derivational innovations in Finno-Ugric, including *ńoma "hare" → *ńoma-la, (vs. Samoyedic *ńomå), *pexli "side" → *peel-ka → *pelka "thumb", though involving Proto-Uralic derivational elements.

Structural features

The Finno-Ugric group is not typologically distinct from Uralic as a whole: the most widespread structural features among the group all extend to the Samoyedic languages as well.

Classification models

Modern linguistic research has shown that Volgaic languages is a geographical classification rather than a linguistic one, because the Mordvinic languages are more closely related to the Finno-Lappic languages than the Mari languages.

The relation of the Finno-Permic and the Ugric groups is adjudged remote by some scholars. On the other hand, with a projected time depth of only 3,000 to 4,000 years, the traditionally accepted Finno-Ugric grouping would be far younger than many major families such as Indo-European or Semitic, and would be about the same age as, for instance, the Eastern subfamily of Nilotic. But the grouping is far from transparent or securely established. The absence of early records is a major obstacle. As for the Finno-Ugric Urheimat, most of what has been said about it is speculation.

Some linguists criticizing the Finno-Ugric genetic proposal also question the validity of the entire Uralic family, instead proposing a Ural–Altaic hypothesis, within which they believe Finno-Permic may be as distant from Ugric as from Turkic. However, this approach has been rejected by nearly all other specialists in Uralic linguistics.

Common vocabulary

Loanwords
One argument in favor of the Finno-Ugric grouping has come from loanwords. Several loans from the Indo-European languages are present in most or all of the Finno-Ugric languages, while being absent from Samoyedic.

According to Häkkinen (1983) the alleged Proto-Finno-Ugric loanwords are disproportionally well-represented in Hungarian and the Permic languages, and disproportionally poorly represented in the Ob-Ugric languages; hence it is possible that such words have been acquired by the languages only after the initial dissolution of the Uralic family into individual dialects, and that the scarcity of loanwords in Samoyedic results from its peripheric location.

Numbers
The number systems among the Finno-Ugric languages are particularly distinct from the Samoyedic languages: only the numerals "2" and "5" have cognates in Samoyedic, while also the numerals, "1", "3", "4", "6", "10" are shared by all or most Finno-Ugric languages.

Below are the numbers 1 to 10 in several Finno-Ugric languages. Forms in italic do not descend from the reconstructed forms.

The number '2' descends in Ugric from a front-vocalic variant *kektä.

The numbers '9' and '8' in Finnic through Mari are considered to be derived from the numbers '1' and '2' as '10–1' and '10–2'. One reconstruction is *yk+teksa and *kak+teksa, respectively, where *teksa cf. deka is an Indo-European loan; notice that the difference between /t/ and /d/ is not phonemic, unlike in Indo-European. Another analysis is *ykt-e-ksa, *kakt-e-ksa, with *e being the negative verb.

Finno-Ugric Swadesh lists
100-word Swadesh lists for certain Finno-Ugric languages can be compared and contrasted at the Rosetta Project website:
Finnish, Estonian, Hungarian, and Erzya.

Speakers
The four largest ethnic groups that speak Finno-Ugric languages are the Hungarians (14.5 million), Finns (6.5 million), Estonians (1.1 million), and Mordvins (0.85 million). Majorities of three (the Hungarians, Finns, and Estonians) inhabit their respective nation states in Europe, i.e. Hungary, Finland, and Estonia, while a large minority of Mordvins inhabit the federal Mordovian Republic within Russia (Russian Federation).

The indigenous area of the Sámi people is known as Sápmi and it consists of the northern parts of the Fennoscandian Peninsula. Some other peoples that speak Finno-Ugric languages have been assigned autonomous republics within Russia. These are the Karelians (Republic of Karelia), Komi (Komi Republic), Udmurts (Udmurt Republic) and Mari (Mari El Republic). The Khanty-Mansi Autonomous Okrug was set up for the Khanty and Mansi of Russia. A once-autonomous Komi-Permyak Okrug was set up for a region of high Komi habitation outside the Komi Republic.

International Finno-Ugric societies

In the Finno-Ugric countries of Finland, Estonia and Hungary that find themselves surrounded by speakers of unrelated tongues, language origins and language history have long been relevant to national identity. In 1992, the 1st World Congress of Finno-Ugric Peoples was organized in Syktyvkar in the Komi Republic in Russia, the 2nd World Congress in 1996 in Budapest in Hungary, the 3rd Congress in 2000 in Helsinki in Finland, the 4th Congress in 2004 in Tallinn in Estonia, the 5th Congress in 2008 in Khanty-Mansiysk in Russia, the 6th Congress in 2012 in Siófok in Hungary, the 7th Congress in 2016 in Lahti in Finland, and the 8th Congress in 2021 in Tartu in Estonia. The members of the Finno-Ugric Peoples' Consultative Committee include: the Erzyas, Estonians, Finns, Hungarians, Ingrian Finns, Ingrians, Karelians, Khants, Komis, Mansis, Maris, Mokshas, Nenetses, Permian Komis, Saamis, Tver Karelians, Udmurts, Vepsians; Observers: Livonians, Setos.

In 2007, the 1st Festival of the Finno-Ugric Peoples was hosted by President Vladimir Putin of Russia, and visited by Finnish President, Tarja Halonen, and Hungarian Prime Minister, Ferenc Gyurcsány.

Population genetics
The linguistic reconstruction of the Finno-Ugric language family has led to the postulation that the ancient Proto-Finno-Ugric people were ethnically related, and that even the modern Finno-Ugric-speaking peoples are ethnically related. Such hypotheses are based on the assumption that heredity can be traced through linguistic relatedness, although it must be kept in mind that language shift and ethnic admixture, a relatively frequent and common occurrence both in recorded history and most likely also in prehistory, confuses the picture and there is no straightforward relationship, if at all, between linguistic and genetic affiliation. Still, the premise that the speakers of the ancient proto-language were ethnically homogeneous is generally accepted.

Modern genetic studies have shown that the Y-chromosome haplogroup N3, and sometimes N2, is almost specific though certainly not restricted to Uralic- or Finno-Ugric-speaking populations, especially as high frequency or primary paternal haplogroup. These haplogroups branched from haplogroup N, which probably spread north, then west and east from Northern China about 12,000–14,000 years before present from father haplogroup NO (haplogroup O being the most common Y-chromosome haplogroup in Southeast Asia).

A study of the Finno-Ugric-speaking peoples of northern Eurasia (i.e., excluding the Hungarians), carried out between 2002 and 2008 in the Department of Forensic Medicine at the University of Helsinki, showed that the Finno-Ugric-speaking populations do not retain genetic evidence of a common founder. Most possess an amalgamation of West and East Eurasian gene pools that may have been present in central Asia, with subsequent genetic drift and recurrent founder effects among speakers of various branches of Finno-Ugric. Not all branches show evidence of a single founder effect. North Eurasian Finno-Ugric-speaking populations were found to be genetically a heterogeneous group showing lower haplotype diversities compared to more southern populations. North Eurasian Finno-Ugric-speaking populations possess unique genetic features due to complex genetic changes shaped by molecular and population genetics and adaptation to the areas of Boreal and Arctic North Eurasia.

Some of the ethnicities speaking Finno-Ugric languages are:

(Baltic Finnic)
 Chud
 Estonians
 Finns
 Izhorians
 Karelians
 Livonians
 Setos
 Veps
 Votes
 Tornedalians
 Kvens

(Volgaic)
 Burtas
 Mari
 Merya people
 Meshchera people
 Mokshas
 Mordvins
 Muromian people
 Sámi

(Permic)
 Besermyan
 Komi
 Komi-Permyaks
 Udmurts

(Ugric)
 Hungarians
 Székely
 Csángó
 Jasz
 Kun
 Palóc
 Khanty
 Mansi

See also

 Baltic Finnic peoples
 Finnic languages
 Volga Finns
 Comb Ceramic culture
 Uralic languages
 Uralo-Siberian languages
 Old Hungarian script
 Old Permic script
 Proto-Finnic language
 Proto-Uralic homeland hypotheses
 International Finno-Ugric Students' Conference

References
Notes

Further reading
 Aikio, Ante (2003). Angela Marcantonio, The Uralic Language Family: Facts, Myths and Statistics. (Book review.) In: Word – Journal of the International Linguistic Association 3/2003: 401–412.
 Bakró-Nagy Marianne 2003. Az írástudók felelőssége. Angela Marcantonio, The Uralic Language Family. Facts, myths and statistics. In: Nyelvtudományi Közlemények 100: 44–62.
 Bakró-Nagy Marianne 2005. The responsibility of literati. Angela Marcantonio, The Uralic Language Family. Facts, myths and statistics. In: Lingua 115: 1053–1062.
 
 
 Campbell, Lyle: Historical Linguistics: An Introduction. Edinburgh University Press 1998.
 
 De Smit, Merlijn 2003: A. Marcantonio: The Uralic language family. Facts, myths and statistics (review). In: Linguistica Uralica 2003, 57–67.
 Encyclopædia Britannica 15th ed.: Languages of the World: Uralic languages. Chicago, 1990.
 Georg, Stefan 2003. Rezension: A. Marcantonio: The Uralic Language Family. Facts, Myths and Statistics. In: Finnisch-Ugrische Mitteilungen Band 26/27.
 
 Kallio, Petri 2004. (Review:) The Uralic Language Family: Facts, Myths, and Statistics (Angela Marcantonio). In: Anthropological Linguistics Vol. 46, no. 4: 486–489.
 Laakso, Johanna. 1999. Karhunkieli. Pyyhkäisyjä suomalais-ugrilaisten kielten tutkimukseen (A Bear Tongue. Views on the Research of the Finno-Ugric Languages). Helsinki: SKS.
 
 Laakso, Johanna. 2004. Sprachwissenschaftliche Spiegelfechterei (Angela Marcantonio: The Uralic language family. Facts, myths and statistics). In: Finnisch-ugrische Forschungen 58: 296–307.
 Marcantonio, Angela: What Is the Linguistic Evidence to Support the Uralic Theory or Theories? – In Linguistica Uralica 40, 1, pp 40–45, 2004.
 Marcantonio, Angela: The Uralic Language Family: Facts, Myths and Statistics. 2003.
 Marcantonio, Angela, Pirjo Nummenaho, and Michela Salvagni: The "Ugric–Turkic Battle": A Critical Review. In Linguistica Uralica 37, 2, pp 81–102, 2001. Online version.
 Oja, Vilja (2007). "Color naming in Estonian and cognate languages". In: MacLaury, Robert E.; Paramei, Galina V.; Dedrick, Don (Ed.). Anthropology of Color: Interdistiplinary multilevel modeling. Amsterdam, Philadelphia: John Benjamins B V Publ. pp. 189–209.
 Saarikivi, Janne 2004. Review of: Angela Marcantonio. Uralic Language Family: Facts, Myths and Statistics. In: Journal of Linguistics 1/2004. p. 187–191.
 
 
 Sinor, Denis (ed.): Studies in Finno-Ugric Linguistics: In Honor of Alo Raun (Indiana University Uralic and Altaic Series: Volume 131). Indiana Univ Research, 1977, .
 Vikør, Lars S. (ed.): Fenno-Ugric. In: The Nordic Languages. Their Status and Interrelations. Novus Press, pp. 62–74, 1993.
 Wiik, Kalevi: Eurooppalaisten juuret, Atena Kustannus Oy. Finland, 2002.
  (Languages of the Peoples in the USSR III. Finno-Ugric and Samoyedic Languages).  (Moscow):  (Nauka), 1966. 
 A magyar szókészlet finnugor elemei. Etimológiai szótár (Finno-Ugric Elements of the Hungarian Vocabulary. Etymological Dictionary). Budapest: Akadémiai Kiadó, 1967–1978.

External links

 
 Some Finno-Ugrian links A more comprehensive link collection
 Swadesh lists for the Finno-Ugric languages (from Wiktionary's Swadesh-list appendix)
 FAQ about Finno-Ugrian Languages

 Linguistic Shadow-Boxing Johanna Laakso's book review of Angela Marcantonio's "The Uralic language family. Facts, myths and statistics"
 Uralic Linguistics Vs. Voodoo Science! A collection of links about the "new paradigm" debate by Merlijn de Smit
 Numbers in Asian languages Counting to ten in a variety of languages
 Ugri.info Finno-Ugric peoples infobase
 Finno-Ugric Electronic Library by the Finno-Ugric Information Center in Syktyvkar, Komi Republic Interface in Russian and English, texts in Mari, Komi, Udmurt, Erzya and Moksha languages.
 The Finno-Ugrics: The dying fish swims in water The Economist, 20 December 2005
 "Ethnic origins of Finno-Ugric nations and modern Finno-Ugric nationalism in the Russian Federation" by Konstantin Zamyatin

Uralic languages
History of Ural